Kıran can refer to:

 Kıran, İnegöl
 Kıran, Taşköprü